Widman is a surname. Notable people with the surname include:

Allan Widman (born 1964), Swedish politician
Charles Widman (1879–1944), American football player
John Widman, American luthier
Kjell-Ove Widman, Swedish mathematician (1940–)
Peter Widman, Swedish painter (1948–)

See also
Widmann